Tesselaar Tulip Festival is held in Silvan, Victoria every spring since 1954. It has become one of iconic tourist attraction in Victoria, Australia with more than 120 varieties of tulips are shown on a 55-acre farm. This tulip farm was initiated by a couple of Dutch immigrants, Cees and Johanna Tesselaar. They arrived in Melbourne at 1939 and started to grow  tulips, gladioli and daffodils on their land. After purchasing a bigger land in Silvan, they grew more tulip bulbs and it attracted people to stop by on their property and admire their fields. At 1954, Cees and Johanna decided to publicly open the farm with silver coin donation for Red Cross Australia. In 2017, around 900,000 tulip bulbs are planted using modern machinery and 80,000 of bulbs still planted traditionally by hand. This tulip festival has been evolved to include music, food and wine festival to attract more visitors during the spring season (September - October).

In 2020 the Festival was cancelled, for the first time, due to COVID-19 lockdown rules.

Gallery

References

Flower festivals in Australia